Ulitino is a rural locality (a settlement) in Plesetsky District, Arkhangelsk Oblast, Russia. The population was 493 as of 2010. There are 12 streets.

Geography 
Ulitino is located on the Onega River, 94 km northwest of Plesetsk (the district's administrative centre) by road. Ig is the nearest rural locality.

References 

Rural localities in Plesetsky District